Leacanabuaile is a stone ringfort (cashel) and National Monument in County Kerry, Ireland.

History
The cashel was built around the 9th century AD as a defended farmstead.

The Irish name means "hillside of the milking-place".

The site was excavated in 1939–40; objects found included iron knives and pins, bone combs, bronze, millstones, and lead, dating from the 9th or 10th century AD.

Description

Protected on three sides by steep grassy slopes, the entrance is on the east side. It is built of drystone with gaps filled in with rubble.

Inside are three stone beehive houses and a souterrain.

References

National Monuments in County Kerry
Archaeological sites in County Kerry